Huntington Beach Adventure Playground is an adventure playground located within Huntington Beach Central Park in Huntington Beach, California. The first adventure playground in Huntington Beach was established in the 1970s at the bottom of a quarry pit not far from the playground's present site. The original playground included a small shack, office, snack bar, and tool shed. After a number of years in its original location, and a temporary interim nearby due to flooding, the adventure playground was relocated to its present location in 1983. The adventure playground consists of several acres with a shallow pond, treehouses, a "mud park", rafts, rope climbing features, loose parts and scrap wood, and tools.

See also 
 Adventure playground
 Playwork

References

Playgrounds
Adventure playgrounds